Helical scan is a method of recording high-frequency signals on magnetic tape. It is used in open-reel video tape recorders, video cassette recorders, digital audio tape recorders, and some computer tape drives.

History
Earl Edgar Masterson from RCA patented the first helical scan method in 1950. German engineer Eduard Schüller developed a helical scan method of recording in 1953 while working at AEG. With the advent of television broadcasting in Japan in the early 1950s, they saw the need for magnetic television signal recording. Dr. Kenichi Sawazaki  developed a prototype helical scan recorder in 1954.

Gallery

See also 

Type A videotape
1 inch type B videotape
1 inch type C videotape
IVC videotape format about the IVC 2 inch helical VTR, Model 9000
Video tape recorder (VTR)
Vision Electronic Recording Apparatus
Ampex 2 inch helical VTR
Symmetric Phase Recording

References

External links 
 Sony U.S. patent for U-matic videotape cassette, filed 1971.
 Sony U.S. patent for design of U-matic deck, filed 1971.
 video preservation and conservation museum
 The history of television, 1942 to 2000 By Albert Abramson, page 93.
Ampex page in the Experimental TV Center

Audiovisual introductions in 1953
Film and video technology
Japanese inventions
Tape recording